"Baby Talk" is a song was originally released as a single in 1959 by The Laurels on Spring Records, though their version failed to chart.
Later in 1959, the song was recorded by Jan and Dean which was a Top 10 hit for them on Dore Records. In 1962, Jan & Dean released a sequel to the song, entitled "She's Still Talking Baby Talk".

Background
Jan Berry worked on the song with friends and Dore Records staffers Lou Adler and Herb Alpert.  Alpert recalled recording the song in Jan's garage.  While not usually considered part of the "surf pop" genre, it contains many elements of what would become the signature sound of southern California in the early '60s such as the close vocal harmonies combined with falsetto sounds. Original pressings of the single were mislabeled as by "Jan & Arnie"; this was later corrected.

Chart performance
The song spent 12 weeks on the Billboard Hot 100 chart peaking at No. 10, while reaching No. 28 on Billboards Hot R&B Sides.

References

1959 debut singles
1959 songs
Jan and Dean songs
Song recordings produced by Lou Adler
Doré Records singles